Events from the year 1857 in Germany.

Incumbents
 King of Bavaria – Maximilian II
 King of Hanover – George V
 King of Prussia – Frederick William IV
 King of Saxony – John of Saxony

Births 

 January 18 – Otto von Below, German general (d. 1944)
 February 22 - Heinrich Hertz , German physicist (d. 1894 )
 April 30 – Walter Simon, German philanthropist (d. 1920)
 May 27 – Theodor Curtius, German chemist (d. 1928)
 June 30 – Friedrich von Ingenohl, German admiral (d. 1933)
 July 5 – Clara Zetkin, German-born Marxist theorist, activist and women's rights advocate (d. 1933)
 July 19 – Eugen Bamberger, German chemist (d. 1932)
 July 23 – Carl Meinhof, German linguist (d. 1944)
 August 14 – Max Wagenknecht, German composer (d. 1922)
 August 15 – Albert Ballin, German shipping magnate, owner of the Hamburg America Line (d. 1918)
 August 27 – Oskar von Hutier, German general (d. 1934)
 September 8 – Georg Michaelis, Chancellor of Germany (d. 1936)
 November 29 – Theodor Escherich, German pediatrician (d. 1911)
 December 3 – Franz Bunke, German painter (d. 1939 )

Deaths 

 January 27 – Dorothea Lieven,  Baltic-German diplomat in Russian services (b. 1785)

 
 November 26 – Joseph von Eichendorff, German poet (b. 1788)
 December 3 – Christian Daniel Rauch, German sculptor (b. 1777)

Years of the 19th century in Germany
Germany
Germany